Blitz++ is a high-performance vector mathematics library written in C++. This library is intended for use in scientific applications that might otherwise be implemented with Fortran or MATLAB.

Blitz++ utilizes advanced C++ template metaprogramming techniques, including expression templates, to provide speed-optimized mathematical operations on sequences of data without sacrificing the natural syntax provided by other mathematical programming systems. Indeed, it has been recognized as a pioneer in the area of C++ template metaprogramming.

References

External links

C++ numerical libraries
Free software programmed in C++